Kumysolechebnitsa is a rural locality (a settlement) in Savinskoye Rural Settlement, Pallasovsky District, Volgograd Oblast, Russia. The population was 245 as of 2010. There are 4 streets.

Geography 
Kumysolechebnitsa is located on the left bank of the Torgun River, 35 km northeast of Pallasovka (the district's administrative centre) by road. Maximovka is the nearest rural locality.

References 

Rural localities in Pallasovsky District